Justice L. Narasimha Reddy (born 1 August 1953) was the Chief Justice of Patna High Court and was the seniormost judge of Hyderabad High Court. He was recently appointed Chairman CAT and as the Chancellor of University of Hyderabad.

Education
Narasimha Reddy was born in an agricultural family in Gavicharla village, Warangal, Telangana. He received his B.Sc. degree from C.K.M. College, Warangal, and went on to earn his bachelor's as well as master's degree in Law (International Law) from Osmania University, Hyderabad.

References

1953 births
Living people
20th-century Indian judges
People from Hanamkonda district
Judges of the Andhra Pradesh High Court
Chief Justices of the Patna High Court
21st-century Indian judges